Guðrún Lárusdóttir (8 January 1880 – 20 August 1938) was an Icelandic politician, writer and translator. She most notably served two terms as a member of the Althing, the national parliament of Iceland.

Biography
Guðrún was born in Valþjófsstað, Fljótsdalur, the daughter of Lárus Halldórsson (1851–1908), a parliamentarian and priest, and his wife Kirstín Katrín Pétursdóttir Guðjohnsen (1850–1940). At a young age, she wrote about issues regarding women's rights. She also translated works from Danish, English and German to Icelandic. In 1899, she moved to Reykjavík with her family. She published her first novel, a three-part series titled Ljós og skuggar, between 1903 and 1905. Guðrún first sat in the town council of Reykjavík between 1912 and 1918. She was elected to the Althing, serving from 1930 to 1934, and was the second woman in the country to serve this position. Ingibjörg H. Bjarnason previously became an MP in 1922. In 1934, she became the first woman elected to the Althing for the Independence Party, a position she held until her death.

Guðrún married Sigurbjörn Ástvaldur Gíslason in 1902. They had 10 children – five of whom died in childhood.

On 20 August 1938, Guðrún was killed in a road accident. She was accompanied by her husband and two of their daughters, as well as a driver, when the vehicle they were travelling in plummeted into the Tungufljót river. She died by drowning along with her two daughters, Guðrún and Sigrún. Her husband and the driver managed to escape.

Publications
 Ljós og skuggar : sögur úr daglega lifinu, 1903
 A heimleið skáldsaga úr sveitinni, 1913
 Skáldsaga ur sveitinni., 1913
 Mod hjemmet, 1916
 Sigur : smásaga, 1917
 Tvær smásögur, 1918
 Brúðargjöfin : saga, 1922
 Móðir og barn : eftir sænska móður, 1932
 Þess bera menn sár : skáldsaga, 1935
 Sólargeislinn hans og fleiri smásögur handa börnum og unglingum, 1938
 Systurnar : skáldsaga, 1938
 Á heimleið : Sjónleikur í 4 þáttum eftir samnefndri skáldsögu : Lárus Sigurbjörnsson sneri sögunni í leik, 1939
 Ritsafn Guðrúnar Lárusdóttur : skáldsögur, sögur fyrir unglinga, erindi og hugvekjur., 1949
 Tríggjar smásögur : Umsett úr íslendskum eftir: Sonarfórn. Sönn jólagleði. Jósef, av Victor Danielsen. Kápumynd teknað av Ingálvi av Reyni, 1957
 Smásögur, 1966
 Tríggjar smásögur, 1979

References

1880 births
1938 deaths
Guðrun Larusdottir
Guðrun Larusdottir
Guðrun Larusdottir
Guðrun Larusdottir
Guðrun Larusdottir
Guðrun Larusdottir
Guðrun Larusdottir
Deaths by drowning
Guðrún Lárusdóttir
Guðrún Lárusdóttir
Guðrún Lárusdóttir
20th-century translators